Luboš Jíra (born 30 August 1968) is a Czech luger. He competed in the men's singles and doubles events at the 1988 Winter Olympics. His son competed in the luge at the 2010 Winter Olympics.

References

External links
 

1968 births
Living people
Czech male lugers
Olympic lugers of Czechoslovakia
Lugers at the 1988 Winter Olympics
Place of birth missing (living people)